Fox Evil is a novel by British crime-writer Minette Walters. It won the Crime Writers' Association Gold Dagger in 2003, making her one of the few writers to win the award more than once.

External links 
More about Fox Evil on Walters' website
Agent's dedicated page

2002 British novels
Novels by Minette Walters
Macmillan Publishers books